Lake Rotoroa lies within the borders of Nelson Lakes National Park in the South Island, New Zealand.  The lake is fed by the D'Urville and Sabine rivers.

The greatest depth is 145 metres, and it has an area of just under 23.5 km.  The lake is surrounded by beech forest.  Rotoroa is a small community at the base of the lake.  The Gowan River flows out of the lake at this point, thus making the lake one of the sources of the Buller River system.

A track follows the northeast side of the lake and a water taxi travels the length of the lake to ferry trampers to and from the tracks at the head of the lake.

The lake has introduced trout, which attract recreational fishermen. There is a fly-fishing lodge, Lake Rotoroa Lodge, on the lake.

The word rotoroa is Māori for long lake.

References 

Lakes of the Tasman District

zh:漢米爾頓湖